SM UB-105 was a German Type UB III submarine or U-boat in the Imperial German Navy during World War I. She was commissioned into the Imperial German Navy on 14 January 1918 as SM UB-105.

UB-105 was surrendered to Britain on 16 January 1919 and broken up in Felixstowe in 1922.

Construction

She was built by Blohm & Voss of Hamburg and following just under a year of construction, launched at Hamburg on 7 July 1917. UB-105 was commissioned early the next year under the command of Kptlt. Wilhelm Marschall. Like all Type UB III submarines, UB-105 carried 10 torpedoes and was armed with a  deck gun. UB-105 had a displacement of  while surfaced and  when submerged. Her engines enabled her to travel at  when surfaced and  when submerged.

Summary of raiding history

References

Notes

Citations

Bibliography

1917 ships
German Type UB III submarines
Ships built in Hamburg
U-boats commissioned in 1918
World War I submarines of Germany